Identity is a 1987 film by the Iranian director Ebrahim Hatamikia. Hatamikia also scripted the film, which starred Jalil Farjad. Set during the Iran-Iraq war, it is an example of Sacred Defense cinema.

Cast 
 Jalil Farjad
 Reza Asadi
 Ali Gholami
 Abolghasem Mobaraki
 Ahmad Nateghi
 Mohsen Aziminia

Production

References

1987 films
1980s Persian-language films
Films directed by Ebrahim Hatamikia
Iran–Iraq War films
Iranian war films